Sjoukje Rosalinde Dijkstra (born 28 January 1942) is a Dutch former competitive figure skater. She is the 1964 Olympic champion in ladies' singles, the 1960 Olympic silver medalist, a three-time World champion (1962–1964), five-time European champion (1960–1964), and the six-time Dutch national champion (1959–1964).

Personal life 
Sjoukje Rosalinde Dijkstra was born on 28 January 1942 in Akkrum, Netherlands. She is the daughter of Lou Dijkstra, a speed skater who competed in the 1936 Winter Olympics. She married Karl Kossmayer, with whom she has two daughters, Rosalie and Katja.

Career 
In the 1953–54 season, Dijkstra was awarded her first senior national medal, bronze behind Nellie Maas and Joan Haanappel, and was assigned to her first ISU Championship, the 1954 Europeans in Bolzano, where she placed 19th. She finished 12th at the 1956 Winter Olympics in Cortina d'Ampezzo, Italy.

After four seasons ranked second to Haanappel, Dijkstra defeated her for the Dutch national title in the 1958–59 season. She also stood on ISU Championship podiums for the first time, taking silver at the 1959 Europeans and bronze at the 1959 Worlds.

Dijkstra won silver behind Carol Heiss at the 1960 Winter Olympics in Squaw Valley, California and at the 1960 World Championships in Vancouver. She became the dominant ladies' single skater after Heiss retired from competition.

Dijkstra won all the World and European Championships held between 1961 and 1964 (except the 1961 World Championships, which were cancelled following the Sabena Flight 548 crash). After taking her sixth consecutive national title, she went on to win gold at the 1964 Winter Olympics in Innsbruck, Austria. It was the first gold for the Netherlands at the Winter Olympics. She is the last person to have won Olympic gold in ladies' figure skating after winning a silver or bronze medal at a prior Olympics.

During her competitive career, Dijkstra was coached by Arnold Gerschwiler in Richmond, London. While her main strength was compulsory figures, she was also a very powerful and athletic free skater who could perform high-quality double Axel jumps and flying spins, and who skated with easy movement and strong flow. At 1.68 metres, she was fairly tall for a skater, and one magazine article noted that "she is much more slender in person than she appears on the ice".

After 1964, Dijkstra turned professional and toured with Holiday On Ice from 1964 to 1972. She became the advisor to the figure skating section of the Dutch Skating Federation in 1985. In 2005, she was awarded the Fanny Blankers-Koen Trophy for her contributions to Dutch sports. On January 9, 2014, she was inducted into the International Figure Skating Hall of Fame at a ceremony during the 2014 U.S. Championships in Boston, Massachusetts.

Dijkstra appeared as herself on the September 13, 1965 episode of To Tell the Truth, receiving three of the four possible votes.

Results

References

1942 births
Living people
Dutch female single skaters
Figure skaters at the 1956 Winter Olympics
Figure skaters at the 1960 Winter Olympics
Figure skaters at the 1964 Winter Olympics
Olympic figure skaters of the Netherlands
Olympic gold medalists for the Netherlands
Olympic silver medalists for the Netherlands
People from Boarnsterhim
Sportspeople from Friesland
Olympic medalists in figure skating
World Figure Skating Championships medalists
European Figure Skating Championships medalists
Medalists at the 1960 Winter Olympics
Medalists at the 1964 Winter Olympics